The 1991 Colorado Buffaloes football team represented the University of Colorado at Boulder in the 1991 NCAA Division I FBS football season. The team was coached by 10th year head coach Bill McCartney, played their home games in Folsom Field in Boulder, Colorado, and were members of the Big Eight Conference. They finished with a record of 8–3–1 (6–0–1 Big 8) to finish as co-conference champions, and they lost to Alabama 30–25 in the 1991 Blockbuster Bowl. In the final AP Poll and Coaches' Poll, Colorado was ranked #20 in both polls.

Schedule

Personnel

Season summary

Wyoming

Baylor

Minnesota

at Stanford

Missouri

at Oklahoma

at Kansas State

Nebraska

at Oklahoma State

Kansas

at Iowa State

Colorado clinched share of Big Eight conference title for third straight season.

Blockbuster Bowl (vs Alabama)

References

Colorado
Colorado Buffaloes football seasons
Big Eight Conference football champion seasons
Colorado Buffaloes football